KOCA-LP (93.5 FM, "Radio Montañesa: Voz de la Gente") is a low-power FM radio station broadcasting a Spanish variety format. Licensed to Laramie, Wyoming, US, the station is currently owned by La Radio Montañesa: Voz de la Gente.

History
The Federal Communications Commission issued a construction permit for the station on June 25, 2001. The station was assigned the KOCA-LP call sign on September 2, 2002, and received its license to cover on May 22, 2003.

References

External links

 

OCA-LP
OCA-LP
Radio stations established in 2003
Regional Mexican radio stations in the United States
2001 establishments in the United States